Friedrich August Berthold Nitzsch (19 February 1832, in Bonn – 21 December 1898, in Kiel) was a German theologian.

The son of Karl Immanuel Nitzsch, he became professor ordinarius of theology at Gießen in 1868 and at Kiel in 1872. He was the author of Das System des Boethius ("The system of Boethius"; 1860) and Grundriss der christlichen Dogmengeschichte, t. I, Die patristische Periode ("Outline on the Christian history of dogma, part 1: The patrician era"; 1870), amongst other texts.

References 

1832 births
1898 deaths
Writers from Bonn
19th-century German Protestant theologians
Academic staff of the University of Giessen
Academic staff of the University of Kiel
German male non-fiction writers
19th-century male writers